The 2012 Country Music Association Awards, 46th Annual Ceremony, is a music award ceremony that was held on November 1, 2012, at the Bridgestone Arena in Nashville, Tennessee and was hosted by Brad Paisley and Carrie Underwood for their fifth time together.

Winners and nominees

Winners are shown in bold.

Hall of Fame

Performers

Presenters

References 

Country Music Association
CMA
Country Music Association Awards
Country Music Association Awards
November 2012 events in the United States
2012 awards in the United States
21st century in Nashville, Tennessee
Events in Nashville, Tennessee